AFC Fiorentina, or simply Fiorentina, is an Italian women's association football club based in Florence, Italy and part of the professional football club ACF Fiorentina.  The club was founded in 2015 when ACF Fiorentina acquired the Serie A license of  the existing women's club A.C.F. Firenze.  Upon its foundation, Fiorentina Women's FC became the first ever professionally affiliated women's football club in the history of Italy. The team competes in Serie A.

In the 2016–17 season, the Fiorentina Women's Football Club won both the Serie A Championship and the Coppa Italia Championship. This was the first scudetto for the club ACF Fiorentina since 1969 and also the first Serie A championship won by ACF Fiorentina's current owner Andrea Della Valle. On 17 June 2017, the club ACF Fiorentina won their first double. The Fiorentina Women's FC for the second consecutive year became the Coppa Italia title holders for their 3–1 win over Brescia.  The Fiorentina Women's FC qualified to participate in the 2017–18 and 2018–19 UEFA Champions League competitions.

The first president of the Fiorentina Women's FC was Sandro Mencucci, who was CEO of ACF Fiorentina.

Players

Current squad

Captains
  Giulia Orlandi (2015–2017)
  Alia Guagni (2017–2020)
 Stephanie Öhrström (2020–2021)
  Greta Adami (2021)
  Alice Tortelli (2021-)

Former players

Honours
Serie A: 2016–17
Coppa Italia: , 
Supercoppa Italiana: 2018

Finals
Supercoppa Italiana: , 2019, 2020

See also 
 List of women's association football clubs
 List of women's football clubs in Italy

References 

Fiorentina
Football clubs in Tuscany
Association football clubs established in 2015
2015 establishments in Italy
Women